Odontopaschia is a genus of snout moths. It was described by George Hampson in 1903.

Species
 Odontopaschia ecnomia Turner, 1913
 Odontopaschia stephanuchra
 Odontopaschia virescens Hampson, 1903

References

Epipaschiinae
Pyralidae genera